Madampi is a 2008 Indian Malayalam-language family drama film written and directed by B. Unnikrishnan. It stars Mohanlal, Ajmal Ameer, Siddique, Kavya Madhavan and Mallika Kapoor. The film was released on 4 July 2008. It received positive reviews from critics and was a box office success.

Plot 
Gopalakrishna Pillai (Mohanlal) is a rich money-lender in a village called Elavumthitta in Pathanamthitta district. People misunderstand him to be money-minded, without having any emotional bond even towards his mother Devaki Amma (KPAC Lalitha) or younger brother Ramakrishna Pillai (Ajmal Ameer).

As the story moves along, we learn more about the hero. He is considered heartless, as he threw out his father Madhava Menon (Sai Kumar) when he was a teenager, for his father's wayward lifestyle. His mother hates him for doing that and his brother hates him because he does not let his brother pursue his dream of being an actor and never gives him any freedom.

His main antagonists are Sreedharan (Siddique) and his younger brothers. Kavya Madhavan assumes the role of Jayalakshmi, a bank manager who is seen as a threat to Gopalakrishna Pillai's money lending business.

It turns out that Ramakrishna Pillai is in love with a girl (Mallika Kapoor) from Gopalakrishna Pillai's rival family. Though Gopalakrishnan Pillai arranges the marriage forgetting the rivalry, after marriage he asks his brother to repay him the expenses he incurred for the marriage and prompts the newlyweds to sleep separately. With this he becomes the most hated person of his brother and mother. Frustrated, Ramakrishna Pillai leaves the house and joins his in-laws against Gopalakrishna Pillai by saying that his money-lending business is illegal. Still that doesn't work.

Ramakrishna Pillai accuses his brother of processioning the family wealth alone and he gives false information to the Income Tax Department files a suite against him in court. In the climax it is revealed by Gopalakrishna Pillai's advocate (Jagathy Sreekumar) that Gopalakrishna Pillai has kept his hard-earned wealth in the name of his younger brother and he was always hard on him just to make him responsible. It also is revealed that his father was not thrown out, but committed suicide in Madurai due to his debts. The story ends happily as the brothers reunite and everyone apologises to Gopalakrishna Pillai.

Cast

 Mohanlal as Puthanveetil Gopalakrishna Pillai 
 Ajmal Ameer as Puthanveetil Ramakrishna Pillai
 Siddique as Kottilakathu Sreedharan
 Sai Kumar as Madhava Menon, father of Gopalakrishna Pillai and Ramakrishna Pillai
 Kavya Madhavan as Jayalakshmi
 Mallika Kapoor as Shymala, Parameswaran's daughter and Ramakrishnan's wife
 K. P. A. C. Lalitha as Puthanveetil Devakiyamma, Gopalakrishna Pillai's and Ramakrishna Pillai's Mother
 Jagathy Sreekumar as Advocate Mohan Kumar
 Innocent as Karayogam President Divakaran Nair
 Vijayakumar as Aravindan, Kottilakathu Parameswaran's Second Son 
 Kiran Raj as Raghu, Kottilakathu Parameswaran's Youngest Son
 Suraj Venjaramoodu as Keedam Vasu
 V. K. Sreeraman as Kottilakathu Parameswaran Kurup
 M. R. Gopakumar as Kottilakathu Raghavan, Parameswaran's younger brother 
 Kozhikode Narayanan Nair as Saghavu Kumaran 
 Tony Sigimon as Mohan Kumar's son
 Madhu as Justice Sukumara Kurup (Cameo)
 Biju Pappan as S.I Vincent
 Deepika Mohan as Raghavan's wife
 Lakshmipriya as Mohan Kumar's wife
 Krishna Praba as Bhavani
 Ashwin Menon as Gopalakrishna Pillai (childhood)
 Swathy Sunilkumar as Jayalakshmi (childhood)
 Sivaji Guruvayoor as Jayalakshmi's father

Production
Filming was completed on 4 June 2008 in Ottapalam. Mohanlal had 47 days of shoot.

Soundtrack

The film has four songs composed by M. Jayachandran. The lyrics are by Gireesh Puthenchery and Anil Panachooran (Jeevitham Oru). The songs "Amma Mazhakarinu" and "Kalyanakacheri" were chartbusters.

Box office
The film collected 1.37 crore from 61 screens in its first weekend (3 days) from Kerala. The film was made on a budget of  3.5 crores. The film got  1 crore 90 lakhs as distribution share,  1 crore 8 lakhs as satellite and video rights,  9 lakhs as audio rights and  25 lakhs as overseas right. It got a gross collection of  7.5 crores within 30 days. The film collected 100 million in total. The movie ran more than 100 days in major centres. Madampi'' became one of the highest-grossing Malayalam films of the year.

Awards
Kerala State Film Awards
 M. Jayachandran – Best Music Director (Kalyanakacheri, Amma Mazhakkarinu)
 Shankar Mahadevan – Best Male Playback Singer (Kalyanakacheri)

Filmfare Awards South
 Dr. K. J. Yesudas – Best Male Playback Singer (Amma Mazhakkarinu)
 Gireesh Puthenchery – Best Lyricist (Amma Mazhakkarinu)

Asianet Film Award
 Best Actor – Mohanlal

Vanitha Film Awards
Best Actor – Mohanlal

AMMA (Dubai) Award
 Best Actor – Mohanlal

See also
 Madampi – aristocratic title equivalent to "lord" in English

References

External links 

2008 films
2000s Malayalam-language films
Films scored by M. Jayachandran
Indian family films
Films shot in Ottapalam
Films shot at Varikkasseri Mana
Films shot in Thrissur
Films directed by B. Unnikrishnan